The 2006 North Carolina Tar Heels football team represented the University of North Carolina at Chapel Hill as a member of Coastal Division of the Atlantic Coast Conference (ACC) during the 2006 NCAA Division I FBS football season. Led by sixth-year head coach John Bunting, the Tar Heels played their home games at Kenan Memorial Stadium in Chapel Hill, North Carolina. North Carolina finished the season 3–9 overall and 2–6 in ACC play to place fifth in the Coastal Division.

Schedule

Coaching staff
The 2006 season was the last for John Bunting as head coach. He was to be replaced by Butch Davis in the postseason.

Team statistics

References

North Carolina
North Carolina Tar Heels football seasons
North Carolina Tar Heels football